Eufala was an unincorporated community in Calhoun County, Florida, United States.

References

Unincorporated communities in Calhoun County, Florida
Unincorporated communities in Florida